Good Men is a 12-minute short film starring Ed Asner and Mark Rydell, written & directed by Brian Connors and produced by Sean Tracey. Associate Producers were Dean Jamali, Neal Wilde, Tom Downey, Phil Gillin, and Mehrdad Sahafi. This micro-budget, two-character film was shot in one day. The drama takes place on an afternoon before an Oscar party. Asner & Rydell get into an argument over the Holocaust, the proposed mosque at ground zero and the conspiracy allegations surrounding the 9/11 attacks on the World Trade Center. Good Men won Best Short at The Los Angeles Arthouse Film Festival in 2012 and screened in numerous cities around the U.S. as well as around the world.

References

External links
 
 

American short films
2011 films